The 2018 Tour of California was a road cycling stage race that took place between May 13 and 19, 2018 in California, United States. It was the thirteenth edition of the Tour of California and the twenty-second event of the 2018 UCI World Tour.

Teams
As a newer event to the UCI World Tour, all UCI WorldTeams were invited to the race, but not obligated to compete in the race. As such, thirteen of the eighteen WorldTeams competed in the race. Four UCI Professional Continental teams also competed making a 17-team peloton. Each team had a maximum of seven riders:

Route

Stages

Stage 1

Stage 2

Stage 3

Stage 4

Stage 5

Stage 6

Stage 7

Classification leadership table
In the Tour of California, five different jerseys were awarded. For the general classification, calculated by adding each cyclist's finishing times on each stage, and allowing time bonuses for the first three finishers at intermediate sprints and at the finish of mass-start stages, the leader received a yellow jersey. This classification was considered the most important of the 2017 Tour of California, and the winner of the classification was considered the winner of the race.

Additionally, there was a sprints classification, which awarded a green jersey. In the sprints classification, cyclists received points for finishing in the top 10 in a stage. For winning a stage, a rider earned 15 points, with 12 for second, 9 for third, 7 for fourth with a point fewer per place down to a single point for 10th place. Points towards the classification could also be accrued – awarded on a 3–2–1 scale – at intermediate sprint points during each stage; these intermediate sprints also offered bonus seconds towards the general classification. There was also a mountains classification, the leadership of which was marked by a white jersey with red polka dots. In the mountains classification, points were won by reaching the top of a climb before other cyclists, with more points available for the higher-categorised climbs.

The fourth jersey represented the young rider classification, marked by a predominantly "white design" jersey. This was decided in the same way as the general classification, but only riders born after January 1, 1992, were eligible to be ranked in the classification. There was also a classification for teams, in which the times of the best three cyclists per team on each stage were added together; the leading team at the end of the race was the team with the lowest total time. In addition, there was a combativity award given after each stage to the rider considered, by a jury, to have "who best exemplifies the character of those engaged in the fight against cancer / heart disease", in line with the jersey's sponsors. This award was marked by a blue jersey.

References

External links

2018 UCI World Tour
2018 in sports in California
2018
May 2018 sports events in the United States